Morris Elis (August 28, 1907 – May 31, 1992 in Lauderhill, Florida) was an American bridge player. Elis was from Lauderhill, and was a graduate of New York University.

Bridge accomplishments

Wins

 North American Bridge Championships (6)
 Masters Individual (2) 1940, 1950 
 von Zedtwitz Life Master Pairs (2) 1938, 1940 
 Vanderbilt (1) 1949 
 Chicago Mixed Board-a-Match (1) 1937

Runners-up

 North American Bridge Championships
 Masters Individual (1) 1946 
 Wernher Open Pairs (6) 1934, 1937, 1938, 1939, 1940, 1947 
 Open Pairs (1928-1962) (1) 1939 
 Vanderbilt (2) 1943, 1954 
 Spingold (1) 1937 
 Masters Team of 4 (1) 1937 
 Chicago Mixed Board-a-Match (1) 1945 
 Spingold (1) 1938

Notes

1992 deaths
Place of birth missing
1907 births
American contract bridge players
People from Lauderhill, Florida
New York University alumni
Sportspeople from Broward County, Florida